Petina is a Croatian village belonging to the town and municipality of Velika Gorica, in Zagreb County. In 2011, its population was 213.

Geography
The village is located in north of Zagreb Airport and close to the city limits of Zagreb, near Sava river. Its nearest villages are Velika Kosnica and Mala Kosnica. Petina is served by the A3 motorway at the exit "Kosnica".

References

Populated places in Zagreb County
Velika Gorica